Gelbison is a mountain in the Lucan Subappennines range of the Apennine Mountains system, with an elevation of . It is located in the southern Cilento region of the Province of Salerno, in the Campania region, of southern Italy.

The mountain is within the Cilento and Vallo di Diano National Park.

Geography
Monte Gelbison is included in the commune of Novi Velia. The western part of the mountain includes several other communes, such as Vallo della Lucania, and ends at the southern Cilentan Coast in the Tyrrhenian Sea.

History
At its top is the sanctuary of Madonna del Monte Sacro, with a tall cross which is illuminated by night. The sanctuary perhaps weasel words occupies the site an ancient temple of the Oenotrians, dedicated to a deity later identified with Hera.

The name derives from a Saracen medieval presence, since it comes from the Arabic "Mount of the Idol", perhaps referring to the ancient sanctuary.

See also
Monte Bulgheria
Monte Cervati
Monte Stella

References

External links

Mountains of Campania
Mountains of the Apennines
Cilento